The Satellite Award for Best Original Screenplay is an annual award given by the International Press Academy.

Winners and nominees

1990s

2000s

2010s

2020s

References

External links
 Official website

Screenplay Original
Screenwriting awards for film